The FIFA Order of Merit is the highest honour awarded by FIFA. The award is presented at the annual FIFA congress. It is normally awarded to people who are considered to have made a significant contribution to :association football.

At FIFA's centennial congress they made one award for every decade of their existence. These awards were also handed out to fans, organisations, clubs, and one to African Football. These were referred to as the FIFA Centennial Order of Merit.

The winner does not have to be directly involved with football to receive it. One such notable non-footballing personality was Nelson Mandela who won it for bringing South Africa back to international football.

Recipients

Personalities directly involved in football

Associations

Clubs

Players

Managers

Referees

Administrators

Other individuals

Other collectives

Commercial brands

References

External links

Order of Merit
Awards established in 1984
International orders, decorations, and medals